The Alekhine Memorial was a recurring chess tournament, organized in different cities and irregular intervals, honoring the former world chess champion Alexander Alekhine.

The Alekhine Memorial tournaments have no numbering (technically it is not a series), sometimes it is thus unclear whether or not an event can be regarded as an Alekhine Memorial (as for instance at Moscow in 1959 and the following Moscow Central Chess Club International tournaments).

Immediately after Alekhine's death, Erich Eliskases won at Rio de Janeiro in 1946 the first Alekhine Memorial ever held.

Winners
{| class="wikitable"
|-
!Year !! Host cities !! Winners !! Points !! Players
|-
| 1956 || Moscow, Soviet Union ||  || 11/15 || 16
|-
| 1971 || Moscow, Soviet Union ||  || 11/17 || 18
|-
| 1975 || Moscow, Soviet Union ||  || 10½/15 || 16
|-
| 1986 || Cascais, Portugal ||  || 7/10 || 11
|-
| 1992 || Moscow, Russia || || 4½/7|| 8
|-
| 2013 || Paris, FranceSaint Petersburg, Russia ||  || 5½/9 || 10
|}

Alekhine Memorial 1992
Alekhine Memorial 1992 was held in Moscow, Russia in November. Field included such participants as former world champion Anatoly Karpov, Alexei Shirov, Viswanathan Anand, Boris Gelfand, Jan Timman and Gata Kamsky, who were in top 10 at that time. First place was tied between Gelfand and Anand, while Kamsky finished in clear third.
{| class="wikitable" style="text-align:center;"
|+Alekhine Memorial, 1992, Moscow, Russia, Category XVIII (2676)
!  !! Player !! Rating !! 1 !! 2 !! 3 !! 4 !! 5 !! 6 !! 7 !! 8 !! Points 
|- style="background:#cfc;"
| 1 || align=left | || 2685
|   || 1 || ½ || ½ || 1 || 1 || 0 || ½ || 4½ 
|- style="background:#cfc;"
| 2 || align=left |  || 2690
| 0 || || 1 || ½ || ½ || 1 || ½ || 1 || 4½ 
|-
| 3 || align=left |  || 2655
| ½ || 0 ||  || 1 || ½ || 0 || 1 || 1 || 4 
|-
| 4 || align=left | || 2640
| ½ || ½ || 0 ||  || ½ || ½ || 1 || ½ || 3½ 
|-
| 5 || align=left |  || 2655
| 0 || ½ || ½ || ½ ||  || ½ || ½ || 1 || 3½ 
|-
| 6 || align=left |  || 2715
| 0 || 0 || 1 || ½ || ½ ||  || ½ || 1 || 3½ 
|-
| 7 || align=left |  || 2710
| 1 || ½ || 0 || 0 || ½ || ½ ||  || ½ || 3
|-
| 8 || align=left |  || 2665
| ½ || 0 || 0 || ½ || 0 || 0 || ½ ||  || 1½ 
|}

Alekhine Memorial 2013
The first part of the tournament (rounds 1–5) was held at the pavilion built in the Tuileries Garden in Paris, France, on 20–25 April 2013. The second part (rounds 6–9) was held at the Russian Museum in Saint Petersburg, Russia, on 28 April – 1 May 2013. The prize money of the tournament is €100,000.

Tiebreaks
In the case that two or more players have equal points, the following criteria were utilized to decide the placings:
 The largest number of games played with the black pieces.
 The largest number of wins.
 The result of the personal match.
 The Koya score.
 The Sonneborn-Berger score.

Standings
{| class="wikitable" style="text-align:center;"
! !! Player !! Rating !! 1 !! 2 !! 3 !! 4 !! 5 !! 6 !! 7 !! 8 !! 9 !! 10 !! Points !! Black !! Wins !! H2H !! Koya !! SB
|-
| 1 || align=left |  || 2809
| X || ½ || ½ || ½ || ½ || ½ || 1 || 1 || 0 || 1 || 5½ || 5 || 3 || || ||
|-
| 2 || align=left |  || 2739
| ½ || X || ½ || 1 || ½ || ½ || ½ || ½ || 1 || ½ || 5½ || 5 || 2 || || ||
|-
| 3 || align=left |  || 2783
| ½ || ½ || X || 0 || ½ || 1 || ½ || ½ || 1 || ½ || 5 || 4 || 2 || || ||
|-
| 4 || align=left |  || 2727
| ½ || 0 || 1 || X || ½ || ½ || 0 || ½ || ½ || 1 || 4½ || 5 || 2 || || ||
|-
| 5 || align=left |  || 2712
| ½ || ½ || ½ || ½ || X || ½ || 0 || 1 || ½ || ½ || 4½ || 5 || 1 || 0.5 || 3.5 || 20.25
|-
| 6 || align=left |  || 2706
| ½ || ½ || 0 || ½ || ½ || X || 1 || ½ || ½ || ½ || 4½ || 5 || 1 || 0.5 || 3.5 || 20.00
|-
| 7 || align=left |  || 2801
| 0 || ½ || ½ || 1 || 1 || 0 || X || ½ || ½ || ½ || 4½ || 4 || 2 || 0.5 || 3.5 ||
|-
| 8 || align=left |  || 2722
| 0 || ½ || ½ || ½ || 0 || ½ || ½ || X || 1 || 1 || 4½ || 4 || 2 || 0.5 || 2.5 ||
|-
| 9 || align=left |  || 2707
| 1 || 0 || 0 || ½ || ½ || ½ || ½ || 0 || X || ½ || 3½ || 4 || 1 || || ||
|-
| 10 || align=left |  || 2747
| 0 || ½ || ½ || 0 || ½ || ½ || ½ || 0 || ½ || X || 3 || 4 || 0 || || ||
|}

References

External links 
Brasilbase: Standings of the 1946 tournament
WhyChess: Games of the 2013 tournament
ChessBomb: Games of the 2013 tournament

Chess competitions
2013 in chess
Chess in Paris
2013 in Russian sport
2013 in French sport
Chess in Russia
Sports competitions in Saint Petersburg
Chess memorial tournaments